HD 9446 is a star located about 164 light-years away in the constellation of Triangulum, near the southwestern constellation border with Pisces. This object can be viewed with binoculars or a telescope, but it is too faint to be seen with the naked eye at its apparent visual magnitude of 8.35. It is drifting further away from the Sun with a radial velocity of +21 km/s.

This object is a G-type main sequence star with a stellar classification of G5V. The physical properties this star appear similar to the Sun, making it a candidate solar analog. However, the measured abundance of elements with more mass than helium is outside the accepted range. It is roughly two billion years in age and has an active chromosphere. The amount of activity measured in the chromosphere corresponds to a star with a rotation period of about 10 days.

On 5 January 2010, scientists announced the discovery of two planets orbiting around HD 9446.

See also 
 List of extrasolar planets

References 

G-type main-sequence stars
Planetary systems with two confirmed planets
Triangulum (constellation)
Durchmusterung objects
009446
007245